Caloptilia atomosella is a moth of the family Gracillariidae. It is known from the United States (the Atlantic States, New Mexico, Louisiana, Alabama, and Texas).

References

atomosella
Moths of North America
Moths described in 1873